Mohand Laenser (Arabic: محند العنصر; born 1942) is a Moroccan politician and current president of the Popular Movement party and former Minister of the Interior. He was born in Imouzzer Marmoucha.

See also
 Popular Movement

References

External links
 Official website of the popular movement party

Moroccan politicians
1942 births
Living people
People from Fès-Meknès
Popular Movement (Morocco) politicians
Moroccan Berber politicians